Tambu is the ninth studio album by American rock band Toto. It was released in May 1995 through Sony Records. Tambu has sold 600,000 copies worldwide. It is the band's first album to feature Simon Phillips following Jeff Porcaro's death in 1992. The album includes the single "I Will Remember", which failed to chart in the US but was the band's first chart hit in the UK since "I Won't Hold You Back" twelve years before.

Tambu was a nominee for Grammy Award for Best Engineered Album, Non-Classical in 1997.

Reception

AllMusic's review reflected on the album as a major change of direction for Toto, commenting on the anguished and highly vague philosophical lyrics and the focused, bluesy musical style. They found Steve Lukather's performance as chief lead vocalist of such quality that it was puzzling why he hadn't been given the role earlier, and concluded "You couldn't call the result accomplished, but Tambu suggested that Toto was embarked on a new personal and musical journey that might lead in an interesting direction."

The Absolute Sound called the album "brilliant" and "near-perfect", saying that it was better than the band's previous works.

Track listing

Personnel 
Adapted from album's liner notes.

Toto
 Steve Lukather – guitars, lead vocals (1-10, 12), backing vocals (1-5, 7-10, 12), bass fills (5), acoustic piano (2, 6, 10), synthesizers (2, 6), mandolin (12)
 David Paich – synthesizers (1, 3-13), acoustic piano (1-5, 7-9, 11-13), string arrangements and conductor (2, 4, 10, 12), Fender Rhodes (5, 7, 10), Hammond organ (5, 7, 10), backing vocals (5, 7), lead vocals (7, 9)
 Mike Porcaro – bass guitar, additional keyboards (7)
 Simon Phillips – drums, drum loops (5), Roland TR-808 (6), additional keyboards (7)

Featured musicians
 Jenny Douglas-McRae – lead vocals (5, 7, 9, 13), backing vocals (1-5, 7-10, 12)
 John James – lead vocals (9), backing vocals (2, 5, 7, 8)
 Michael McDonald – backing vocals (2)

Additional musicians
 Steve Porcaro – drum loops (5)
 Lenny Castro – percussion (1, 2, 6)
 Michael Fisher – percussion (4)
 Paulinho da Costa – percussion (5, 7, 8)
 Phillip Ingram – backing vocals (5, 7, 9)
 Ricky Nelson – backing vocals (5, 7)
 Jim Giddens, Steve Lukather, Stan Lynch, Mike Porcaro and Elliot Scheiner – S.P. chant (1)

Production 
 Produced by Elliot Scheiner and Toto
 Recorded by Elliot Scheiner, Al Schmitt and Bill Smith.
 Mixed by Elliot Scheiner
 Additional recording by John Jessel
 Assisted by Jim Giddens, Stephen Genewick, and Sean Schimmiel.
 Digitally Edited and Mastered by Ted Jensen at Sterling Sound (New York, NY).
 Production Coordination – Ivy Skoff
 Keyboard Programming and Set-Up – John Jessel
 Set-Up for David Paich and Mike Porcaro – Paul Jamieson
 Guitar Tech – Gavin Menzies
 Cartage for Steve Lukather – Andy Braun Studio Rentals
 Piano Tuner – Keith Albright
 Set-Up for Simon Phillips – Drum Paradise
 String Contractor – Shari Sutcliffe
 Management – The Fitzgerald Hartley Co.
 Creative Direction – Doug Brown
 Art Direction – Eric Scott
 Cover and Portraiture – Daniel Brereton
 Photography – Melanie Lawrence

Additional notes
Catalogue: (CD) Sony Legacy 64957

Singles
 I Will Remember / Dave's Gone Skiing (released in UK and EU)
 Drag Him to the Roof / I Will Remember (released in Japan)
 The Other End of Time / Slipped Away (released in EU)
 Just Can't Get to You / I'll Be Over You (released in EU)
 The Turning Point / The Road Goes On (released in EU)
 If You Belong to Me / Don't Stop Me Now (released in EU)

References

 Tambu (1995)

Toto (band) albums
1995 albums
Albums produced by Elliot Scheiner
Albums recorded at Capitol Studios
Sony Music albums
Hard rock albums by American artists